Roodt may refer to:

Roodt (surname)
Roodt, Ell
Roodt-sur-Eisch
Roodt-sur-Syre